Wild and Peaceful is the debut studio album by American singer-songwriter Teena Marie. Released on March 31, 1979 by Motown. It features significant contributions from Rick James who produced and wrote the bulk of material as well as providing co-vocals on "I'm a Sucker for Your Love".

Wild and Peaceful peaked at #18 on the Black Albums chart and #94 on the Billboard Albums chart. The lead single "I'm a Sucker for Your Love" reached #8 on the US Black Singles chart and #43 in the UK, and was followed by a cover version of "Don't Look Back" originally recorded by The Temptations.

Motown didn't include a photograph of the singer on the album sleeve, leading many listeners to assume she was African-American.

Track listing
All tracks composed by Rick James, except where indicated.

Side A
"I'm a Sucker for Your Love" - 5:52
"Turnin' Me On" - 6:06
"Don't Look Back" (Cover of The Temptations song) (Smokey Robinson, Ronald White) - 7:32

Side B
"Déjà Vu (I've Been Here Before)" - 7:38
"I'm Gonna Have My Cake (And Eat It Too)" (Michelle Holland, Teena Marie) - 5:30
"I Can't Love Anymore" - 7:11

2005 Expanded Edition
"I'm a Sucker for Your Love (Instrumental)" - 5:33
"You Got the Love" (Outtake) - 4:34
"Every Little Bit Hurts" (Duet with Rick James) (Ed Cobb) - 7:04

Personnel
Shonda Akiem - percussion
Wally Ali - guitar
Oscar Alston - bass guitar
Jack Andrews - mastering
Christopher Anthony Boehme - percussion
Garnett Brown - trombone
Oscar Brashear - trumpet
The Colored Girls - backing vocals, ensemble
Ernie Fields, Jr. - saxophone
Lanise Hughes - drums
Rick James - guitar, percussion, piano, arranger, conga, drums, timbales, vocals, backing vocals, timpani, horn and string arrangements, syndrum
Jean King - backing vocals
Daniel LeMelle - flute, saxophone on "I'm Gonna Have My Cake (And Eat It Too)"
Teena Marie - piano, vocals, backing vocals
David Melle - flute, saxophone
Earl Palmer - drums on "I'm Gonna Have My Cake"
Jackie Ruffin - backing vocals
Levi Ruffin, Jr. - synthesizer
Lisa Sarna - backing vocals
Russell Schmitt - engineer
Clarence Sims - piano, keyboards on "I'm Gonna Have My Cake"
Art Stewart - producer, engineer, mixing
Julia Tillman Waters - backing vocals
Ernie Watts - saxophone
Maxine Willard Waters - backing vocals
Adrienne Williams - backing vocals

Charts

Singles

References

Teena Marie albums
1979 debut albums
Albums produced by Rick James
Gordy Records albums